Green Wedge may refer to:

 Green belt, a policy and land-use zoning designation used in land use planning
 Green Ukraine, a region of the Russian Far East